Jayme Odgers (born 1939) was an artist, photographer and graphic designer. He was best known for his new wave design and experimental collage photography of the 1980s.

Biography 

Jayme Odgers graduated from Los Angeles’ Art Center College of Design with a Bachelor's degree in Art 1962. After graduating his first job was designing the wayfarer graphics for the IBM Pavilion at the 1964 World's Fair where he met and later became Paul Rand's assistant.

In the late 1970s Jayme Odgers played an instrumental role in establishing a new look for California design, work that was included in the exhibition Pacific Waves at the Museo Fortuny in Venice, Italy. In the 1980s, he worked with April Greiman  to create posters for the 1984 Summer Olympics and the 100th anniversary of the Swiss publisher Thieme. Odgers' work has been shown at the Museum of Modern Art in San Francisco, the Brooklyn Museum, the Arco Center for the Visual Arts and the Montreal Museum of Fine Arts.  Examples were included in the Walker Art Center's landmark show, Posters of the Centuries: Design of the Avant Garde, and reside in the permanent collections of the Smithsonian Cooper-Hewitt National Design Museum, Victoria and Albert Museum and The White House.  He has amassed over 100 design awards, including Gold Medals from the Art Directors Clubs of New York and Los Angeles, and an international Typomundus Award for typography. Odgers' work is also included in the permanent collection of LACMA.

References

External links
Steven Heller obit
Steven Heller interview interview with Jayme Odgers
History of Graphic Design work by Jayme Odgers

1939 births
Living people
American graphic designers
People from Butte, Montana